Estadio Universitario or Estádio Universitário ("University Stadium") may refer to:

Brazil
Estádio Universitário Pedro Pedrossian in Campo Grande, Mato Grosso do Sul
Estádio Universitário São Paulo in São Paulo

El Salvador
Estadio Universitario UES in San Salvador

Mexico
Estadio Universitario Alberto "Chivo" Córdoba in Toluca, State of Mexico
Estadio Universitario (UANL) in San Nicolás de los Garza (Monterrey), Nuevo León
Estadio Universitario BUAP in Puebla, Puebla
Estadio Universitario Beto Ávila in Veracruz, Veracruz

Portugal
Estádio Universitário de Coimbra in Coimbra
Estádio Universitário de Lisboa in Lisbon

Venezuela
Estadio Universitario de Caracas in Caracas